The Italian Stallion may refer to:

Film 
 Nickname of Rocky Balboa, the fictional character in Rocky and its sequels
 A 1970 low-budget film starring Sylvester Stallone in his first film role, originally titled The Party at Kitty and Stud's

Nickname or stage name 
 Johnny Musso (born 1950), American football player
 Bob Pisani, American television news correspondent
 The Italian Stallion (wrestler) (Gary Sabaugh, born 1957), American professional wrestler
 Rocco Siffredi (born 1964), Italian porn actor
 J.T. Smith (wrestler) (born 1967), American professional wrestler
 Sylvester Stallone (born 1946), American actor, who played the character Rocky Balboa

See also 
 List of Italian horse breeds
 Stallion (disambiguation)